is a series of novels written by Hideyuki Kikuchi and published by Tokuma Shoten. Between 2009 and 2010, the first three books in the series were published by Tor/Seven Seas in English. The first book served as the basis for an anime film and live-action film of the same name.

List of books

Adaptations

Animated film
Wicked City (妖獣都市) is a horror adventure anime film produced by Madhouse. It was directed, character designed, and drawn by Yoshiaki Kawajiri.

Live-action film 
The Wicked City (妖獣都市〜香港魔界篇〜) was released in 1992. It was produced by Tsui Hark in Hong Kong.

References

External links
 Wicked City profile at GoManga.com

Novel series
Novels by Hideyuki Kikuchi
Seven Seas Entertainment titles
Japanese serial novels
Japanese novels adapted into films